Benjamin Carrigan (born 25 July 1998), is an Australian professional footballer who plays as a defender for National Premier Leagues Victoria club Bentleigh Greens.

Club career

Melbourne Victory
On 8 May 2019, he made his professional debut against Daegu FC in the 2019 AFC Champions League, starting the game before being replaced by Aaron Anderson in the 85th minute in an eventual 4–0 loss. Following the conclusion of 2019–20 A-League season, Carrigan was released from the club.

References

External links

1998 births
Living people
Australian soccer players
Association football defenders
Melbourne Victory FC players
National Premier Leagues players